James Edward Ford (6 February 1836 – 11 March 1877) was an English first-class cricketer.

The son of the Reverend James Ford, he was born at Heavitree near Exeter and was educated at Rugby School. He made his debut in first-class cricket for the Marylebone Cricket Club (MCC) against Kent at Gravesend in 1857. In the same year he made two further first-class appearances, playing for the Gentlemen of England against the Gentlemen of Kent and Sussex at Lord's, and for the MCC against Sussex at St Leonards-on-Sea. He died at Hastings in March 1877.

References

External links

1836 births
1877 deaths
Cricketers from Exeter
People educated at Rugby School
English cricketers
Marylebone Cricket Club cricketers
Gentlemen of England cricketers